Salimicrobium salexigens is a Gram-positive, moderately halophilic, strictly aerobic and non-motile bacterium from the genus of Salimicrobium which has been isolated from salted cowhide from Istanbul in Turkey.

References

 

Bacillaceae
Bacteria described in 2011